Victor Carlund (5 February 1906 – 22 February 1985) was a Swedish football midfielder who played for the Swedish national football team. He was a reserve in the 1934 FIFA World Cup, and played for Sweden at the 1936 Summer Olympics. He also played for Örgryte IS.

References

1906 births
Swedish footballers
Sweden international footballers
Association football midfielders
Örgryte IS players
1934 FIFA World Cup players
1985 deaths
Olympic footballers of Sweden
Footballers at the 1936 Summer Olympics